Virtual Rabbit is Susumu Hirasawa's third solo album.

Overview
Virtual Rabbit was made in the same style as the previous two albums, although greater in scale, with compositions more in line with Hirasawa's later solo work, and with a larger focus on orchestral styled instrumentation. It explores reality, religion, science, and dreams.

With this album, Hirasawa continued to streamline his production methods, reducing the use of guest musicians in the album almost completely to choral backing.

This was the first Hirasawa album to be engineered by Masanori Chinzei, who has since worked as engineer on all of Hirasawa's music.

Track listing

Personnel
Susumu Hirasawa - vocals, classical guitar, electric guitar, synthesizers, drum machine, sampler, sequencer, programming, acoustic piano (3), toy accordion (4), Amiga 2500 ("Say" program - Narration (5)), autoharp (7), production

additional musicians
 - backing vocals (2)
Teru Uchida Strings - strings (2)
Toshihiko "BOB" Takahashi (courtesy of Alfa Records) - fretless bass (3, 9), backing vocals (5-6)
Yasuchika Fujii and Kazuhiko Fujii (courtesy of Alfa Records) - backing vocals (5-6)
Mamoru Kikuchi (credited as "WONDER WHO?") - narration/Old Man's voice (5)
Jun Togawa (courtesy of Tōshiba EMI) - vocals (6)

technical
Masanori Chinzei - recording & mixing engineer, backing vocals (4-6)
Masaru Arai, Koreyuki Tanaka, Meiji Takamatsu, Shinji Kobayashi (Mix); Masanori Ihara, Tetsuto Kato (Gold Rush); Hideaki Tamura (Eggs); Yu Ishizaki, Motohiro Yamada (Music Inn) - second engineers
Reiko Miyoshi (Tokyu Fun) - mastering engineer

visuals
Kiyoshi Inagaki (Asset) - art director
Hideki Namai - photography
Kazunori Yoshida - hair & make-up
Akemi Tsujitani - styling

operations
I3 Promotion
Yūichi Kenjo - production, backing vocals (4-6)
Hiroki Yamaguchi - artist management, backing vocals (4-6)
Masami Fujii, Takeshi Fujita, Tsutomu Fukushima - artist management
Hiroyshi Mitomi, Shoko Mashio - publicity coordination
Polydor K.K.
Kazuyoshi Aoki - A&R coordination
Osamu Takeuchi - director, backing vocals (4-6)

Thanks
AC Unit, Ouija Ltd.

Release history

"Bandeira Travellers" is included on the Detonator Orgun Music Special sampler disc.
"Bandeira Travellers [Physical Navigation Version]" and "Clear Mountain Top" are included, respectively, on the Detonator Orgun 1 and 2 soundtrack albums.
"Stormy Sea", "Bandeira Travellers", "Virtual Rabbit" and "Clear Mountain Top" are included on the Root of Spirit～ESSENCE OF HIRASAWA SOLO WORKS～ compilation.
"Stormy Sea", "Bandeira Travellers [Physical Navigation Version]", "Virtual Rabbit" and "Clear Mountain Top" are included on the Archetype | 1989-1995 Polydor years of Hirasawa compilation.

References

External links
 
 Virtual Rabbit at iTunes Japan
 Virtual Rabbit at amazon.co.jp

Susumu Hirasawa albums
Japanese-language albums
1991 albums
Polydor Records albums